Grit Lehmann (born 1 August 1976) is a German former professional volleyball player. In March 2013, she announced her retirement after playing her last game for Swiss club VC Kanti Schaffhausen against Volero Zürich in the Swiss Championships play-off finals.

Facts 
 Position: Universal (outside hitter - middleblock - Opposite)
 Length: 5 ft 98
 Nickname: Gretl, Griti, Grizzly

Teams 
 TZ Treptow (Germany)
 CJD Berlin (Germany)
 VC Olympia Berlin (Germany)
 Marzahner SV (Germany)
 Volley Cats Berlin (Germany)
 Fortis Herentals (Belgien)
 Asterix Kieldrecht (Belgien)
 Tamera Lummen (Belgien)
 Euphony Tongeren (Belgien)
 VfB 91 Suhl (Germany)
 VC Kanti Schaffhausen (Switzerland)

Bio 
 1994 German champion A-youth
 1994 European championship in Hungary (youth): 3rd place
 1995 world championship in Thailand (youth): 8th place
 2001 winner Belgian supercup
 2007 Belgian champion
 2008 Winner German cup
 2010 German cup, runner up
 2013 Swiss vice Champion

References

External links 
 Grit Lehmann official website
 VC Kanti Schaffhausen - official website

1976 births
Living people
German women's volleyball players